At least two ships of the Hellenic Navy have borne the name Aliakmon:

 , a  launched in 1945 as HMS LST 3002 she was renamed on transfer to Greece in 1947. She was sold in 1971 and broken up in the following year
 , a  launched in 1966 as the West German Navy Saarburg she was renamed on transfer to Greece in 1994

Hellenic Navy ship names